The Seth Knapp Jr. House is a historic colonial American house located at 82 Water Street in Rehoboth, Massachusetts.

Description and history 
It is a two-story brick structure, with a gambrel roof pierced by gabled dormers, a four bay wide facade, and a central chimney. A single-story ell extends to the rear. The house was built in about 1735 for Ichabod Wood, and is locally significant as the only surviving pre-1850 brick house in the town. The bricks for the house were locally produced at a brickworks situated on the nearby Palmer River. Seth Knapp Jr., a later owner, made shoes on the property.

The house was listed on the National Register of Historic Places on June 6, 1983.

See also
National Register of Historic Places listings in Bristol County, Massachusetts

References

Houses in Bristol County, Massachusetts
Buildings and structures in Rehoboth, Massachusetts
Houses on the National Register of Historic Places in Bristol County, Massachusetts
Georgian architecture in Massachusetts